Jack Monroe is a fictional superhero appearing in American comic books published by Marvel Comics. The character was originally introduced as third sidekick under the Bucky identity, initially treated as the original Bucky Barnes before being retconned as a separate character, and later the most well-known incarnation of Nomad.

Publication history
A character with a complicated history, Jack Monroe's origin involves a complex series of retcons. 

Although the character's first real appearance is as "Bucky" in Captain America #153, the origin of the character, first revealed in Captain America #155 (again by Englehart and Buscema), identifies him as the "Bucky" that appeared in Captain America comics which were originally published in the 1950s.

When they were first published between 1953 and 1954 those Captain America stories, which were written by Don Rico and illustrated by Mort Lawrence and John Romita, Sr., starred Steve Rogers (the original Captain America) and Bucky and were clearly set in the 1950s, with the duo prominently battling communism and a communist Red Skull. However, when the character returned in Avengers #4 (March 1964), it is revealed that the original Captain America has been in a state of suspended animation since a battle he fought near the close of World War II, a battle in which the original Bucky perished.

The 1950s stories were thus considered outside of official canon until Englehart's 1972 Captain America storyline (#153–156; September–December 1972), which attempted to resolve the discrepancy by showing how a teenager (Monroe is simply referred to as "Bucky" throughout, the name "Jack Monroe" was introduced in later stories) and an unnamed man (later known as "The Grand Director") had assumed both the public and private identities of the original Captain America and Bucky as part of a government-sponsored program which planned to replace the lost heroes to combat the "red threat". Captain America #155, which reveals how the two gain super-powers by injecting themselves with a "Super-Soldier Formula" that they find in old Nazi files. The formula initially grants them abilities similar to those of the original Captain America (Steve Rogers).  However, the formula made no mention of the essential Vita-ray exposure portion of the treatment and the absence causes its effects to eventually give them psychotic symptoms. As a result, the two are arrested and put into suspended animation by government agents.

This complicated origin is the reason that some sources list Young Men #24 (December 1953; the first appearance of the communist hunting Captain America and Bucky) as Monroe's first appearance, though the issue was originally intended to depict the original Bucky. A later story, What If #4, (August 1977), further complicates the Bucky history by introducing another "Bucky" (Fred Davis) that takes on the role in 1945, many years before Monroe assumes the title, which makes Monroe the third "Bucky" chronologically.  

Monroe was mostly portrayed as essentially having the same powers as the first Captain America, Steve Rogers.  This has long been a matter of contention in the comics as Monroe received his powers from the same sample of the Super-Soldier Serum that gave the 1950s Captain America superhuman strength.  He became super strong but after being exposed to stabilizing rays (similar to the Vita-rays Steve Rogers received) his strength normalized to peak human.

In Captain America #153–156 "Bucky" and his partner are briefly reawakened decades after being put in suspended animation, but are subdued by Falcon and the original Captain America. In Captain America #232–236 (April–August 1979) — by writers Roger McKenzie, Jim Shooter and Michael Fleisher and artist Sal Buscema — "Captain America" is revived and brainwashed into becoming the fascistic "Grand Director", who shoots and apparently kills his former partner Bucky and later apparently commits suicide. Writer J. M. DeMatteis resurrected the "Bucky" character in Captain America #281 (May 1983), which is the first comic that names him as "Jack Monroe". That story reveals that the gun was loaded with blanks, and the cured Monroe is given the Nomad identity by Steve Rogers in Captain America #282 (June 1983). Nomad then becomes Captain America's partner for the next two years of published comics. DeMatteis' successor as writer of the series, Mark Gruenwald, had Nomad end the partnership in Captain America #309 (September 1985). Gruenwald said he did this "because Nomad made Cap seem old. Cap had to take the mentor relationship with Nomad, and he was coming off as everyone's favorite father figure rather than as the active vital superhero."

However, Gruenwald continued to feature the character in Captain America intermittently. He features in Captain America #324–325 (December 1986–January 1987), and after Steve Rogers is stripped of his Captain America identity, Nomad appears in a storyline which continues for over a year of Captain America stories (#336–350; December 1987–February 1989) where Nomad is one of Rogers's partners as he continues being a superhero under the identity of "The Captain". During this storyline Nomad is depicted as a tetchy and insolent character who takes an instant disliking to Demolition Man, a dislike which only increases when it becomes evident that Vagabond is attracted to him. Though not explicitly stated in the stories themselves, the Captain America letters pages explained that the formula which gave Nomad his powers was again causing him to become aggressive and mentally unstable.

The character next starred in the eight page story "Angel in the Snow" in Marvel Comics Presents #14 (March 1989), which was written by Fabian Nicieza, a writer who would go on to script most of the character's appearances in the following decade and a half. The story is followed up in a backup story in Captain America Annual #9 (1989), in which Monroe discards his spandex outfit and becomes an urban vigilante.

In 1990, Nomad starred in an eponymous four-issue miniseries, written by Nicieza and penciled by James Fry III (November 1990–February 1991). Captain America Annual #10 features a prologue to the upcoming Nomad ongoing series. Again written by Nicieza, the series lasted 25 issues (May 1992–May 1994) and featured artwork from several artists, most notably Pat Olliffe and S. Clarke Hawbaker. At one point in the series Monroe spends an extended period in Los Angeles, California and in one issue (#9; January 1993) Nicieza addresses the subject of the 1992 Los Angeles riots which had recently occurred when the story was first published. In an interview around this time, Nicieza commented, "There are times when I start burning out, getting sick of comics. And then, I'll start plotting or scripting an issue of Nomad, and by the time I'm done, I feel great. ... [Nomad is] about Jack Munroe trying to cope with a life that he doesn't have any control over, it's about America, and it's about life. Jack also uses so many detective cliches that it's a blast writing his dialogue — where else can I use, 'The french fries were wetter than a swimsuit calendar'?"

"Dead Man's Hand", a crossover with the Punisher War Journal and Daredevil series also being published at that time, sees Nomad teaming up with the Punisher and Daredevil against a coalition of criminal organizations. The title was also involved in the 1993 Infinity Crusade crossover, and in his own series, Nomad confronts an evil clone of Gambit. At the close of the Nomad ongoing series, the character was believed dead.

In Thunderbolts #49 (April 2001) it was revealed that he was in fact placed in suspended animation and was revived and temporarily brainwashed into being a new version of the Scourge character. Monroe is next shown by writer Ed Brubaker and artist Steve Epting in Captain America vol. 5 #3 (April 2005) being shot dead by a mysterious assailant, later revealed to be the original Bucky, now known as the Winter Soldier. Captain America vol. 5 #7 (July 2005) by Brubaker and artist John Paul Leon then reveals the events of the last few days of Monroe's life.

Subsequently Marvel published a Jack Monroe story in Thunderbolts From the Marvel Vault #1 (June 2011) written by Fabian Nicieza and illustrated by Derec Aucoin, which followed Jack Monroe after his time as Scourge.

Fictional character biography
Jack Monroe was born in Naugatuck, Connecticut. He became an adventurer and the partner of William Burnside who had assumed the identity of Steve Rogers in the 1950s. After operating together for some time as Bucky and Captain America, respectively, the two were placed in suspended animation. The two superheroes are reawakened decades after being put in suspended animation. In their delusional state, the man and teenager who were the 1950s Captain America and Bucky attempt to kill the original Captain America and the Falcon. However they are eventually captured and returned to a state of suspended animation.

Burnside is later revived and brainwashed by the psychologist Doctor Faustus into becoming the fascistic Grand Director, leader of the National Force. Under Faustus' control Burnside shoots and apparently kills his former partner Bucky. Faustus and Burnside are defeated by the original Captain America and Daredevil after which Burnside commits suicide.

It is later revealed that Faustus had loaded the gun with blanks as he intended to use Monroe in a later plot which was never realized. Monroe was subsequently taken into S.H.I.E.L.D. custody and seemingly cured of his psychotic symptoms. Monroe then sought out Steve Rogers, and dons a Bucky costume to help him defeat the female terrorist Viper. Monroe is then given Rogers' former Nomad identity, and Monroe dons the Nomad costume to battle the Viper alongside Captain America. Nomad next battled the Slayer.

Nomad then became Captain America's partner, and battled the Sisters of Sin. As Bucky, he psychologically battled Baron Zemo. Nomad helped Captain America defeat the Red Skull, a conflict in which the Red Skull seemingly perished. Nomad completed a successful solo mission apprehending the deranged Madcap, and afterwards ends his partnership with Captain America.
 
Nomad later obtained a new costume, and battled the Slug, dismantling his criminal empire with Captain America's assistance. Monroe returns again after Steve Rogers is stripped of the Captain America identity by the Commission on Superhuman Activities. Rogers continues being a superhero under the identity of "The Captain" and, wearing a black version of his regular costume, he begins traveling the country fighting evil with a group of his former partners, including Nomad, Demolition Man and the Falcon. The group also includes Nomad's then-girlfriend, a neophyte adventurer who goes by the codename Vagabond. During this storyline Nomad is depicted as a tetchy and insolent character who takes an instant disliking to Demolition Man, a dislike increased by an apparent attraction between Vagabond and Demolition Man.

Nomad battled Vibro. When a faction of the Serpent Society under the leadership of the terrorist Viper attempts to poison the Washington, DC water supply, The Captain and his team intervenes.  During these events, Nomad, Vagabond, and Demolition Man are captured by The Commission and imprisoned. The former Serpent Society leader known as Sidewinder uses his teleportation ability to enter the jail and free Diamondback, a Society member who has remained loyal to Sidewinder and helped The Captain fight Viper, and as a result was in jail, too. Sidewinder offers to free the other heroes imprisoned there, but Vagabond and Demolition Man turn him down, saying that they think it was wrong to flee the authorities. Nomad scoffs at this notion, and decides to leave the jail with Sidewinder and Diamondback. This incident ends his relationship with Vagabond. The Captain approaches Nomad for help, but finds Nomad in a bar, drunk. Upon finding out Rogers plans to give himself up to the Commission, Nomad refuses to help him and the two men part on bad terms.

Going solo again, Nomad began a war against drug dealer Umberto Safilios. Monroe later discards his spandex outfit choosing to become an urban vigilante. Monroe kidnaps an infant girl from her drug addicted mother, naming her "Bucky". The Commission on Superhuman Activities begins to put Monroe under scrutiny. The Commission, allied with the military, sends Steve Rogers (now restored to the Captain America role) to try and subdue Nomad. In a subsequent firefight Nomad defeats Safilios, and kills several drug dealers and government officials. Nomad begins to spend some time on the road, dealing with problems not usually the purview of superheroes, such as AIDS, homelessness, and hate crimes.

At one point Monroe spends an extended period in Los Angeles, California. While in L.A. Nomad becomes loosely affiliated with the "Undergrounders", a network of people across America who willingly help each other out in need. This allows Nomad access to trusted babysitters when he needs to enter situations far, far too dangerous for Bucky (though many think Nomad's life is consistently far too dangerous). During this phase of his life, Nomad sheds much of his previous acerbic, self-destructive personality, and becomes a more laid-back, compassionate person. Later Nomad realizes that both he and/or Bucky could be infected with HIV, Bucky due to her parentage and Nomad due to his time receiving medical care from the Undergrounders. He has himself and Bucky tested but it is never revealed if either of them are infected.

Nomad later teams up with the Punisher and Daredevil against a coalition of criminal organizations. During the Infinity Crusade, Nomad is shown among dozens of superheroes who travel into outer space. Nomad doesn't have much involvement in the events, however, and he and Forge are literally seen hanging around during much of the action. Nomad does confront an evil clone of Gambit who had gotten lost on the way to the battles. Around this time, Nomad is one of the heroes recruited by Doctor Strange to battle the demonic threat of Lilin, a powerful ancient queen.
 
During his time on the road, Nomad confronts the Hate-Monger, Man-Thing and even the mother of Bucky herself, who had been brainwashed into a trained assassin sent to kill him. The assassination training is done by the 'Favor Broker', an adversary who plagues Nomad throughout much of his series.

Nomad is eventually believed dead after a confrontation with his old hometown's Nazi militia (Monroe's father had been a Nazi sympathizer during World War II) but it was revealed that he was in fact placed in suspended animation. An innocent bystander's body was used to replace his.

Some time later, Henry Gyrich revives Monroe and infuses his body with nanites that placed him under command, and turned Monroe into a new version of the Scourge of the Underworld. Though Monroe was conscious and aware of his actions, he could neither resist Gyrich's orders nor reveal his true identity or details of his servitude to anyone. As Scourge, he battled the Thunderbolts who eventually freed him from Gyrich's control.

After returning to his original Nomad costume and identity, Monroe began to relapse into some psychotic episodes and symptoms. At this time, Monroe had checked in on his former ward he called Bucky who had since been adopted. Jack is shot dead by a mysterious assailant as he leaves a bar. The cyborg assassin Winter Soldier is ultimately revealed to be Monroe's assassin.

Powers and abilities
While Jack Monroe's strength, endurance, reflexes, and agility were not beyond the limits of the human body, they were superior to that of any Olympic athlete who ever competed. As a result of not going through the Vita-Ray process, his transformation eventually drove him insane and gave him a form of cancer.

As Nomad, he wore a pair of stun-discs on each shoulder near the collarbone. These  tool-steel alloy discs could be thrown as projectile weapons.

Monroe has extensive experience in hand-to-hand combat, having received personal tutoring by Captain America. He is also an expert marksman.

As Scourge, he had access to an array of equipment based on devices confiscated from costumed criminals, created for the Scourge identity by the Commission on Superhuman Activities on Henry Gyrich's orders. Such items seen in use by Monroe include versions of the Goblin glider, the Unicorn's energy-projecting headgear, and Stilt-Man's telescoping legs, as well as other unspecified weaponry. Certain items were installed in the Scourge costume, while others were miniaturized with Pym particles and stored in one of the costume's gauntlets; all of this equipment was accessible through voice-coded commands. Monroe was also able to use his gauntlet's store of Pym particles to alter his own size or that of other people and objects; however, his supply of the particles was not infinite, and exhausting that supply could force him to abandon much of his stored weaponry.

Reception

Comic Book Resources placed him as one of the superheroes Marvel "wants you to forget".

References

External links
 Jack Monroe at Marvel.com

Captain America
Characters created by John Romita Sr.
Characters created by Fabian Nicieza
Comics characters introduced in 1953
Comics characters introduced in 1982
Fictional characters from Connecticut
Fictional child soldiers
Fictional cryonically preserved characters in comics
Fictional murderers
Marvel Comics martial artists
Marvel Comics sidekicks
Marvel Comics superheroes
United States-themed superheroes
Vigilante characters in comics